Lycopersicon was a genus in the flowering plant family Solanaceae (the nightshades and relatives). It contained about 13 species in the tomato group of nightshades. First removed from the genus Solanum by Philip Miller in 1754, its removal leaves the latter genus paraphyletic, so modern botanists generally accept the names in Solanum. The name Lycopersicon (from Greek λυκοπέρσικον meaning "wolf peach") is still used by gardeners, farmers, and seed companies. Collectively, the species in this group apart from the common cultivated plant are called wild tomatoes.

Cladistic analysis of DNA sequence data confirms Lycopersicon as a clade that is part of a lineage of nightshades also including the potato (S. tuberosum). If it is desired to continue use of Lycopersicon, it can be held as a section inside the potato-tomato subgenus whose name has to be determined in accordance with the ICBN.

Selected species
Former specific names are cited if they have significantly changed when moving to Solanum, are:

Arcanum group
 Solanum arcanum Peralta (= Lycopersicon peruvianum var. humifusum C.H.Mull.)
 Solanum chmielewskii (C.M.Rick, Kesicki, Fobes & M.Holle) D.M.Spooner, G.J.Anderson & R.K.Jansen
 Solanum neorickii D.M.Spooner, G.J.Anderson & R.K.Jansen (= Lycopersicon parviflorum C.M.Rick, Kesicki, Fobes & M.Holle)

Lycopersicon group
 Solanum cheesmaniae (L.Riley) Fosberg (= Lycopersicon peruvianum var. parviflorum Hook.f.)
 Solanum galapagense S.C.Darwin & Peralta (= Lycopersicon cheesmaniae f. minor (Hook.f.) C.H.Mull., L. cheesmaniae var. minor (Hook.f.) D.M.Porter, L. esculentum var. minor Hook.f.)
 Solanum lycopersicum L. – Tomato, cherry tomato etc. (= Lycopersicon cerasiforme, L. lycopersicum and many others)
 
 Solanum pimpinellifolium L. – Currant tomato (= Lycopersicon esculentum ssp. intermedium Luckwill, L. esculentum ssp. pimpinellifolium (L.) Brezhnev in Zhukovskii, L. esculentum var. racemigerum (Lange) Brezhnev in Zhukovskii, L. pissisi Phil., L. racemiforme Lange, L. racemigerum Lange)

Eriopersicon group
 Solanum chilense (Dunal) Reiche (= Lycopersicon atacamense Phil., L. bipinnatifidum Phil., L. peruvianum ssp. puberulum (Phil.) Luckwill, L. puberulum Phil.)
 Solanum corneliomulleri J.F.Macbr. (= Lycopersicon glandulosum C.H.Mull.)
 Solanum habrochaites S.Knapp & D.M.Spooner (= Lycopersicon agrimoniifolium Dunal in DC., L. hirsutum Dunal)
 Solanum huaylasense Peralta
 Solanum peruvianum L. – Peruvian nightshade (= Lycopersicon commutatum (Spreng.) Roem. & Schult., L. dentatum Dunal, L. regulare Dunal)

Neolycopersicon group
 Solanum pennellii Correll

Other "wild tomatoes"

Colloquially, wild tomato is used for several unrelated Solanum species with tomato-like fruit or leaves. The term is inaccurate and may be dangerous, as some of these species may be fatally poisonous:
 Physalis angulata (Cut-leaved groundcherry)
 Solanum carolinense (Carolina horsenettle)
 Solanum quadriloculatum (a "bush tomato" of Australia)
 Solanum wallacei (Wallace's nightshade)
and others.

References

Further reading
Peralta, Knapp & Spooner: (2005): New Species of Wild Tomatoes (Solanum Section Lycopersicon: Solanaceae) from Northern Peru. Systematic Botany 30(2): 424-434.

Solanum
Historically recognized angiosperm genera